is the sixth major (eleventh overall) single from J-pop teen idol group Cute, released on July 30, 2008. It is the first single to feature all members receiving solo lines. It was released both as a normal edition and limited edition. The limited edition has eight interchangeable covers, and the first press of both versions contained a card with a serial number, used in the "lottery" promotional event. The single's main vocalist is Airi Suzuki, who is also the center with Saki Nakajima. The single peaked at #5 on the Oricon Chart, lasting 4 weeks, whereas the Single V peaked at #21 and lasted 3 weeks. The song also ranked #200 in the overall 2008 charts.

The song supposedly tells the (rumored) story of the Great Fire of Meireki, also known as the "Furisode Fire". It was originally written for Hiroshi Itsuki, but when Tsunku heard it and enjoyed it he asked for permission for Cute to sing it instead, to which Hiroshi obliged.

At the end of 2008, for the song "Edo no Temari Uta II", which was chosen as one of the best works of the year, Cute was nominated for the main Japan Record Award but lost to Exile and had to be content with a Gold Award.

Track listings

CD single

DVD single 

Note: This is the PV of the song.

Charts

Awards

Japan Record Awards 
The Japan Record Awards is a major music awards show held annually in Japan by the Japan Composer's Association.

|-
|rowspan=2| 2008
|rowspan=2 align="center"| "Edo no Temari Uta II" / Cute
| Gold Award
| 
|-
| Grand Prix

| 

See also
 50th Japan Record Awards

References

External links
Edo no Temari Uta II at the Up-Front Works discography (Japanese)
Single V at the Up-Front Works discography (Japanese)
Edo no Temari Uta II at the official Hello! Project discography (Japanese)
Single V at the official Hello! Project discography (Japanese)
Edo no Temari Uta II info & comments at Tsunku's official site (Japanese)

2008 singles
Japanese-language songs
Cute (Japanese idol group) songs
Song recordings produced by Tsunku
Zetima Records singles
Songs with music by Ryudo Uzaki
2008 songs